Arecibo Message is the third album by electronic musician Boxcutter.

Track listing 
Boxcutter – 	"Sidetrak" 	4:03
Boxcutter – 	"Mya Rave v2" 	4:10
Boxcutter – 	"Arecibo Message" 4:25
Boxcutter – 	"S P A C E B A S S" 3:53
Boxcutter – 	"Arcadia 202" 3:13
Boxcutter – 	"Old School Astronomy" 4:32
Boxcutter – 	"A Familiar Sound" 4:34
Boxcutter – 	"Free House Acid" 4:14
Boxcutter – 	"Sidereal Day" 3:29
Led Piperz – 	"Otherside Remix" (Earth Is My Spaceship) 4:10
Boxcutter – 	"Lamp Post Funk" 2:47
Boxcutter – 	"Kab 28" 2:50
Boxcutter – 	"A Cosmic Parent" 2:47

References

2009 albums
Boxcutter (musician) albums